Atlant-Soyuz Airlines, known as Moscow Airlines during 2010-2011,  was an airline based in Moscow, Russia, that operated domestic and international passenger flights out of Vnukovo International Airport from 1993 to 2011.

History 

OJSC Atlant-Soyuz Airlines was founded and started operations in June 1993, offering passenger and cargo flights using Soviet-build aircraft. The first Boeing airplane was added to the fleet in 2006. In 2007, the company was owned by private investors (75 percent) and the City of Moscow (25 percent) and had 726 employees. Initial plans for a joint-venture with US-based cargo airline Evergreen International Airlines were brought forth in 2007, but never materialized.

On 17 September 2010, the airline was rebranded as Moscow Airlines. Following this step, all Ilyushin Il-76 cargo aircraft were removed from the fleet, marking the end of dedicated cargo flights. On 17 January 2011, Moscow Airlines discontinued all flight activities, and the company went into liquidation.

Destinations 
In December 2010, Moscow Airlines served the following scheduled destinations:
Azerbaijan
Ganja - Ganja Airport
Nakhchivan - Nakhchivan Airport
Czech Republic
Brno - Brno-Tuřany Airport
Russia
Gelendzhik - Gelendzhik Airport
Moscow - Vnukovo International Airport hub
Sochi - Sochi International Airport
Tajikistan
Dushanbe - Dushanbe Airport
Uzbekistan
Bukhara - Bukhara International Airport
Fergana - Fergana Airport
Samarkand - Samarkand Airport
Tashkent - Tashkent International Airport

Fleet 
As of November 2010, Moscow Airlines operated a fleet of 8 Boeing 737 aircraft with an average age of 12.8 years for scheduled passenger flights. Additionally, it owned several older Tupolev and Ilyushin aircraft, which mostly served on charter routes.

Aircraft gallery

References 

Defunct airlines of Russia
Companies based in Moscow
Airlines established in 1993
Airlines disestablished in 2011
1993 establishments in Russia
2011 disestablishments in Russia